Lino Golin (born 31 January 1945 in Soave) is an Italian former footballer who played as a midfielder. He made nearly 250 appearances in the Italian professional leagues, and played for 6 seasons (65 games, 7 goals) in Serie A for Milan, Varese and Foggia.

Honours
Milan
 Serie A champion: 1967–68.
 Coppa Italia winner: 1971–72, 1972–73.
 UEFA Cup Winners' Cup winner: 1972–73.
 Intercontinental Cup winner: 1969.

References

1945 births
Living people
Italian footballers
Association football midfielders
Hellas Verona F.C. players
U.S. Pistoiese 1921 players
A.C. Milan players
S.S.D. Varese Calcio players
A.C. Monza players
Calcio Foggia 1920 players
Serie A players
Serie B players